Peter Platt (4 February 1965 in Vienna) is an Austrian performing musician and composer.

Biography 
At 6 years old he entered at the Gänserndorf's music school and began to learn playing accordion and trumpet.

Later he changed for tenor tuba and organ.

At 8 years old he composed for the first time.

At 10 years old he composed and published his first march. In 1979 he managed the entry exam of the Vienna music university in order to study trombone.

Then still playing trombone he entered the Vienna's conservatory studying jazz where he obtained the mention of excellence in 2000 in jazz music theory, composing and musical arrangements. 

In 2003 he was appointed IGP professor with the mention of excellence.

He won the recognition award in consideration for all his composition.

He became trombonist substitute in Vienna's opera orchestra on permanent basis.

He is the conductor of the Auersthal city orchestra since 1997 and the conductor substitute of Gänserndorf district.

He worked as music professor in Deutsch-Wagram, Strasshof, Gänserndorf, Dürnkrut and Auersthal.

Since 2005 he is the school principal of the school of music in Gänserndorf.

Until now he had composed more than 530 musical works, mainly for harmonic orchestras and also for jazz band and big band.

Works 

 Tornado
 Symphonic Ouvertüre
 Hase und Adler
 Mr. X-Man
 Rhapsody of Fire
 Spirit of Europe 
 Red Hot
 The Happiness of Music
 Starlight Ouvertüre
 Western-City
 Marcia España
 Mariandl Marsch
 Herzog Cumberland Marsch
 Mit frischem Schwung
 Jodelzwi
 Am Halterberg
 Fuhrmann Polka
 Scoubidou für Violine
 El Tanguista f. Gitarrenquartett
 Salmonellentänze f. Klarinettenquartett

Links 
 Website from Peter Platt

References 
 http://www.noen.at/
 http://www.heavybrass.com

1965 births
Living people
Austrian male composers
Austrian male musicians